Spilosoma latiradiata is a moth in the family Erebidae. It was described by George Hampson in 1901. It is found in South Africa and Zambia.

Description of the female

Head and thorax yellow tinged with olive brown; palpi, lower part of frons, antennae, a broad stripe on vertex of thorax, pectus, and legs deep black; abdomen orange above, with segmental black bands expanding into dorsal spots, a lateral series of black spots connected with the black ventral surface which has a series of orange spots reduced towards extremity. Forewing fulvous orange, with deep black fascia nearly filling the cell, submedian interspace, and the interspaces beyond the cell; a slight postmedial black streak above inner margin. Hindwing fuscous black, the base yellowish, the cilia yellow.

Wingspan 46 mm.

References

External links

Moths described in 1901
latiradiata